The Sisters of St. Francis of Philadelphia are a women's religious congregation of the Third Order of Saint Francis founded in 1855 by Maria Anna Boll Bachmann, an immigrant from Bavaria. The congregation is known for its work in education and healthcare.

History
Maria Anna Boll Bachmann was a widow with four children, whose husband, Anthony, had died of injuries sustained due to anti-immigrant sentiment fomented by the American Nativist Party in Philadelphia. In the aftermath of her husband's death, Bachmann established a small shop and hostel for immigrant women in her home.

Bishop John Neumann had asked Pope Pius IX for permission to bring German Dominican Sisters to Philadelphia but was advised by the Pope to establish a congregation of Franciscan Sisters instead. The new religious community was founded in April 1855 with Bachmann, her sister, Barbara Boll; and Anna Dorn, a secular Franciscan residing at the hospice. Bachmann was named superior and given the name Sister Mary Francis. Their rosary has seven decades, commemorating the Seven Joys of the Blessed Virgin Mary.

The sisters nursed the sick and poor while supporting themselves by piecework sewing. During a smallpox epidemic in 1858, they continued to care for the sick in their patients’ homes or in their convents. In December 1860, the congregation opened its first hospital, St. Mary's in Philadelphia. In 1896, the Motherhouse was located to Glen Riddle, Pennsylvania, and they became familiarly known as "the Glen Riddle Franciscans".

St. James' Protectory in Reybold, Delaware was established by Bishop Thomas Albert Andrew Becker of Wilmington in September 1879 as an orphanage for boys. It was run by the Sisters of St. Francis of Philadelphia. In 1891 the sisters were called to Boston to staff St. Francis Home in Roxbury; the community remained on staff until 1966.

In 1892, at the request of Katharine Drexel, six sisters left Philadelphia to staff a school at St. Stephens Mission on the Wind River Indian Reservation in Wyoming. The mission had been established by the Jesuits in 1884. In 1976, the school was turned over to the Arapaho. The sisters continued to serve at the mission until 1981. In October 1890 the sisters opened St. Joseph Orphanage in Spokane, Washington. By the turn of the century, there were nearly 800 sisters serving in 88 missions in 19 dioceses. The community lost eight sisters and a candidate during the 1918 influenza pandemic.

At their height in 1958, the Sisters of St. Francis of Philadelphia numbered 1,600 sisters working in schools, hospitals, and in social services.

The "Capuchin Sisters of the Infant Jesus" was founded in 1911 by Angela Clara Pesce to serve the Italian-speaking population of New Jersey, where they ran schools. With their motherhouse in Ringwood, New Jersey, they became known as the Franciscan Sisters of Ringwood (FSR). In 2003 the community merged with the Sisters of St. Francis of Philadelphia.

Present day
As of 2022 the congregation includes about 355 sisters in 19 states, Ireland, and Africa. They serve in a variety of ministries: prayer ministry; parish and diocesan ministry; spiritual and pastoral care; service to the elderly, the homeless, the poor, persons with AIDS, and immigrants and refugees. The motherhouse is in Aston, Pennsylvania. There is also a program called "Franciscan Companions" for members of the laity to participate in the congregation's prayer and ministry.

In 1938, the sisters founded the Catholic High School of Baltimore; they continue to sponsor the school. The school is incorporated as a separate legal entity with a governing board that includes lay women and men and Sisters of St. Francis of Philadelphia.

In the 1970's St. Joseph Orphanage Spokane became St. Joseph Children’s Home, and ceased operations in 1982 when the state changed its policy to a preference for foster homes. The premises then housed St. Joseph Family Center, offering counseling programs until it too closed in 2016 due to financial considerations. 

In 1965 the Sisters of St. Francis of Philadelphia founded Our Lady of Angels College in Aston, Pennsylvania. The name was changed to Neumann College in 1980 in honor of Saint John Neumann, and became Neumann University in 2009. In the summer of 2021, the University entered into an agreement to purchase the contiguous Our Lady of Angels Motherhouse for dormitory space. Some sisters will continue to reside on the premises. The congregation retains the Assisi House retirement convent; Red Hill Farm, a member-supported community farm; and the Franciscan Spiritual Center. The retired sisters at Assisi House make sandwiches for the poor and homeless of Philadelphia.

The Sisters of St. Francis, are a co-sponsor, along with the Archdiocese of Philadelphia, Neumann University, and St. Katherine Drexel Parish, of Drexel Neumann Academy in Chester, Pennsylvania.

Related congregations
The Sisters of St. Francis of Philadelphia was the founding congregation of daughter communities: the Sisters of St Francis of Syracuse (1860) and the Sisters of St. Francis Third Order Regular of Buffalo (Williamsville Franciscans) (1863). The Buffalo community, in turn, founded the Sisters of St. Francis of Millvale. In November 2003, the latter two merged; in 2007, all three merged to form the Sisters of St. Francis of the Neumann Communities.

St. Joseph Hospital in Tacoma, Washington was established in 1891; it is now St. Joseph Medical Center, a Level II trauma center.

References

External Links 
 Official Website
 Tilghman, Mary. "With convent closing, Franciscan Sisters bid goodbye to Bradshaw parish", Catholic Review, May 17, 2021
 "At 102, Delco sister says she’s grateful, and still serving God", Catholic Philly, July 25, 2022
 "Baltimore native feels ‘at home’ with Philadelphia’s Sisters of St. Francis", Catholic Review, July 28, 2022

Women's religious organizations